Joseph Brant (born July 13, 1969) is an American murderer and rapist who killed one woman in New Orleans but is suspected of killing at least three more from October 2007 to September 2008 in the then-post-Hurricane Katrina environment.

Brant was in prison on burglary charges when the other cases finally caught up to him. He eventually confessed and pleaded guilty to the other three murders and is still awaiting sentencing as of 2021.

New Orleans Murders 
On January 11, 2008, Jody Johnson, a former cheerleader from Georgia struggling with a painkiller addiction, was walking in the 7th Ward until she went missing later. Her body was eventually found the next day, with a gunshot wound to the front of the head, and it was clear that it had been set on fire. Then on August 11, 2008, the body of Jessica Hawk, a 32-year-old botanist, was found inside her home on Chartres Street in Bywater, New Orleans.

On the night of September 27, 2008, Kirsten Brydum, a San Francisco community activist who was visiting New Orleans, left a party to go home. Later the next day, police found Brydum's body on side of the road. She had a gunshot wound to the head, and her purse and wallet were stolen. Because of that, police initially believed her death occurred during a robbery in which the perpetrator engaged in a struggle.

Confessions 
In 2013 Joseph Brant, a 44-year-old convict serving time for burglary in a Texas prison, was linked and soon confessed to the Hawk murder and three years later pleaded guilty to charges of second-degree murder and a judge sentenced him to life imprisonment.
In early February 2018 Brant informed his attorneys he wanted to provide information on other unsolved killings in New Orleans. He soon confessed to the murders of the other two New Orleans women and a fourth murder.

The fourth victim was an unidentified woman found in a burnt out car in 2007. Brant told investigators that on October 17, 2007, he solicited sex with the unnamed woman, but when she refused he pulled a knife on her and forced her into the car, then strangled her to death while trying to rape her. He then placed the woman's body inside a stolen car abandoned by the train tracks, doused her with gasoline and set her on fire, possibly destroying any possible ways for identification in the future.

See also 
List of serial killers in the United States

References 

1969 births
American rapists
Living people
Suspected serial killers
Violence against women in the United States